Liernu Airfield  is a recreational airfield located near Éghezée, Namur, Wallonia, Belgium. Its very shortish runway will only accommodate ultralight planes.

See also
 List of airports in Belgium

References

External links 
 Airport record for Liernu Airport at Landings.com

Airports in Namur (province)